Greatest Hits is a greatest hits album by Danish percussion duo Safri Duo released on 21 June 2010. It is released nearly ten years after Safri Duo scored an international hit single with "Played-A-Live" in 2001, which became the fourth fastest selling single ever in Europe, selling over 1.5 million copies worldwide. The compilation album contains songs from the duo's three commercial studio albums, Episode II (2001), 3.0 (2003), and Origins (2008). It includes the new song, "Helele", which features South African singer Velile Mchunu, and is the official trailer song for the 2010 FIFA World Cup broadcast on German television channel RTL in June–July. The album peaked at number thirty-two in Germany and twenty-three in Switzerland.

Track listing

Charts

Release history

References

2010 greatest hits albums
Safri Duo albums